DanceLife (also known as J.Lo's DanceLife in the UK) is a 2007 dance-oriented reality show, featuring and produced by Jennifer Lopez. The series follows the lives of seven dancers trying to break into the world of professional dance and trying to "make it" in Hollywood.

DanceLife premiered on January 15, 2007, and concluded its first season on March 5, 2007. The show has had guest appearances from Ashlee Simpson, Nelly Furtado, Mary J. Blige, Omarion, The Pussycat Dolls, and Ashley Roberts.

The theme song is "Find A New Way" by Young Love.

Cast
 Blake McGrath The Canadian, who was a third-place male in the first season of So You Think You Can Dance, is a sought after dancer in Hollywood with a long list of credits including: dancing for Madonna, Janet Jackson, and Britney Spears to name a few; momentarily seen in Rent and doing commercials for iPod and GAP. McGrath is now a judge and choreographer on So You Think You Can Dance Canada.

 Staci Flood The former Pussycat Dolls member who has been dancing professionally for over a decade has performed with Britney Spears, Justin Timberlake, and Christina Aguilera and her film credits include Collateral, and Charlie's Angels: Full Throttle. Her career ambitions include singing, with a proposed CD release.

 Michelle "Jersey" Maniscalco The former Philadelphia Eagles cheerleader and Las Vegas showgirl from New Jersey has trained in everything from acrobatics to ballet, and is hoping that dance will be her ticket to fame and her way out of debt. Her nickname is "Jersey". She came second in Wade Robson's MTV show Wade Robson Project, but lost to Tyler Banks. She is now a member of the girl group Pussycat Dolls.

 Kenny Wormald The former baseball player from Boston, with a "Southey" accent to prove it, has danced in videos with Jennifer Lopez, Madonna, Nelly Furtado, Mariah Carey and Prince. He has also starred in You Got Served and played one of the lead roles in Center Stage: Turn It Up. In 2009, he toured with The Pussycat Dolls on the Doll Domination Tour. In 2011, Wormald played Ren McCormack in the re-make of Footloose, a role made famous by Kevin Bacon.

 Nolan Padilla After teaching himself how to dance by watching Janet Jackson videos, he moved to Los Angeles from Wyoming with no car, no connections, no money and a dark past, and is hoping his hard work and talent will lead him to a big break and a big paycheck, but for the moment he's not giving up his day job.  In episode 7, "Double Booked", in a conversation with his mother, Nolan talked about how his relationship with his father has become strained due to his coming out.  During episode 8, "The Last Dance", Padilla and his father reconcile when Padilla's father attends his performance at New York's Gay Pride Celebration. He also was on tour with Miley Cyrus on her WonderWorld tour in 2009.  Nolan is currently performing in the Cirque Du Soleil show LOVE.

 Celestina Aladekoba With almost no professional training, Aladekoba, who is originally from Nigeria, has become a music video "It Girl" after recently co-starring in Prince's "Black Sweat" video. The driven performer sees dance as a first step to greater success.

Episode guide

Season One
Episode 1 – "Auditions"
The life of an up-and-coming dancer can be rough, especially when you have yet to get your foot in the door. There's buzz that a big audition for a Jennifer Lopez project is coming up, and everyone's life comes to a halt when they get a phone call inviting them to the try-out.

The competition level at the audition is high, and the atmosphere is nerve-wracking as the choreographers begin to warm up hopeful candidates. The room goes silent when J-Lo enters with Marc Anthony on her arm. J-Lo encourages the dancers to push their moves to the limits, but to refrain from hurting themselves. After several cuts, many hours have passed, and the candidates have diminished considerably. J-Lo is eventually able to narrow her male search down to two dancers: Kenny, a new dancer imported to L.A. from Boston, and Blake a cocky more established dancer.

Things are not going well for Jersey when she tries to get to her audition. Far from her home and her family, she lives from check to check, struggling to get by with her hopes of landing her big break in Hollywood. When her car breaks down on the way to her audition she arrives just at the tail end of the tryouts in time to meet up with Celestina, and Staci just as they are leaving after being cut. The three new friends head out to get some iced coffee and chat about the life of a prospective dancer can be rough.

Later on Kenny meets up with his roommate Nick at the park with some good and bad news. The bad news is that he's not going to be able to make any of their upcoming football games for a while. The good news is, however, that he got the call from J-Lo's people and he has been booked for her upcoming project.

Episode 2 – "Scraping By"
No one ever said living a DanceLife would be easy, and that is more than evident to Nolan when he receives an eviction notice from his landlord. On top of struggling to keep his head above water, Nolan is just reentering the competitive world of professional dance after a hiatus caused by drug addiction. Worried that he's not going to make it, Nolan puts in extra effort in when he auditions for a spot on the upcoming Mary J. Blige tour.

Things are not going smoothly for Blake either. With the release party for his new DVD just around the corner, the pressure is on for him to tie up several minor details before the event. Blake's frustrations reach an unexpected peak when he gets a call from his agent informing him that the DVDs may not be ready in time for the party on top of word from Kenny that he is going to have to cancel at the last second.

In the final hours before the doors open for the release party, Blake's agent calls to tell him that the DVDs will make it in time. Despite all the worry and panic, things go off without a hitch. The party is packed, DVDs are sold and everyone in attendance seems impressed with Blake's showmanship.

Unfortunately, Nolan's day is not going as well when he receives a call from his agent confirming that the Mary J. Blige choreographers decided to go with a different male dancer for the upcoming tour. Late at night, after work, Nolan rides his bike home knowing that he's facing eviction with no upcoming gigs.

Episode 3 – "New York Minute"
Staci and Jersey both audition for the same gig with GAP, but Staci ends up taking the part. Meanwhile, Kenny loses the male role in the GAP gig to Blake, but ends up getting hired to dance for Nelly Furtado on Saturday Night Live.

Kenny's mom enrolled him in Brockton's Sherry Gold Dance Studio at age 6. He learned acrobatics, ballet, tap, jazz, and modern dance during his 10 years there.

Episode 4 – "Balancing Act"
Celestina struggles to juggle work and her boyfriend. Meanwhile, she and Jersey end up getting a gig with Ashlee Simpson.

Episode 5 – "Waiting on Love"
Blake hosts a premiere party for his GAP commercial. Meanwhile, Kenny meets up with his girlfriend Ashley Roberts, a Pussycat Doll.

Episode 6 – "Making the Video"
Staci has had a good run in the world of dance but now wants to pursue her ultimate goal of becoming a singer. Putting dancing on hold, she gets some help from Blake, Kenny and Celestina to get the next phase in her life up and going. Together, the group create a music video to go along with Staci's new single.

Episode 7 – "Double Booked"
A frustrated Nolan deals with more downs than ups. Between doing some apartment hunting and having it out with Blake, Nolan reveals to his mom that he's gay. His mom takes it well, but it is hinted that the issue is a bit more stressful with Nolan's father.  Jersey auditions for a national commercial for the shoe company Skechers, and for an Omarion music video.  She's thrilled when she is selected for both jobs, but her agent tells her that she will have to choose only one, as both jobs take place on the same day.  Jersey selects the Skechers commercial.  Omarion is shown at the music video shoot, and when he receives the news, calls her actions "unprofessional".  Jersey's car breaks down, and Blake accompanies her to a Ford dealership where she buys a new car.

Episode 8 – "The Last Dance (season finale)"
On the season finale, Nolan and Kenny get to dance for Lopez during one of her concerts. They are flown to New York, and must learn three dances in two days.  Rehearsals go well, and Nolan decides to phone his father and invite him to the concert—a final performance for a Gay Pride event.  The concert concludes, and Nolan finds his father in the crowd.  After returning to LA, Nolan and Blake make nice after their past argument—maybe the start of a friendship.

External links
 Official Site
 Wade Robson Project

Jennifer Lopez
MTV original programming
2000s American reality television series
2007 American television series debuts
2007 American television series endings